Dam-e Tang-e Molghun (also Romanized as Dam-e Tang-e Molghūn; also known as Dam-e Tang) is a village in Emamzadeh Jafar Rural District, in the Central District of Gachsaran County, Kohgiluyeh and Boyer-Ahmad Province, Iran. At the 2006 census, its population was 20, in 6 families.

References 

Populated places in Gachsaran County